Yuriy Arkadiyovych Hudymenko (born 10 March 1966) is a former Kyrgyz-born Ukrainian professional footballer.

Career
Hudymenko is a product of the main Bishkek sports school and later was accepted to the main republican club of Kyrgyzia, FC Alga Bishkek.

In 1990 he made his debut in the Soviet Top League playing for FC Dnepr Dnepropetrovsk, but failed to score any goals in domestic competitions, but did score a goal against Heart of Midlothian F.C. in the 1990-91 UEFA Cup. Next year Hudymenko joined recently relegated FC Rotor Volgograd that was competing in the Soviet First League and gained promotion for the next year, but the Soviet Union fell apart and its football competitions were discontinued.

Upon the dissolution of the Soviet Union, in 1992 he joined the Ukrainian Premier League playing for the Crimean Tavriya Simferopol becoming the Ukrainian Premier League top goalscorer with 12 goals as the Crimean club took the inaugural league title. Hudymenko stayed with Tavriya until the end of the year and played four games for the team in the 1992–93 UEFA Champions League where the team was eliminated in the first round by FC Sion.

In 1993 he joined FC Dynamo Moscow competing in the Russian Premier League and the following year in FC Lada Togliatti.

International
He also earned two caps for Ukraine; the first coming against the US in a scoreless friendly in Piscataway and the second against Hungary in a 2–1 friendly defeat on 26 August 1992 in Nyíregyháza in a match in which he scored a goal.

Career statistics

International goals

Honours
Tavriya Simferopol
 Ukrainian Premier League champion: 1992.

Individual
 Ukrainian Premier League top scorer: 1992.

Notes

External links

References

1966 births
Living people
Sportspeople from Bishkek
Soviet footballers
Kyrgyzstani footballers
Ukrainian footballers
Ukrainian expatriate footballers
Ukraine international footballers
Soviet Top League players
FC Alga Bishkek players
FC Dnipro players
FC Rotor Volgograd players
SC Tavriya Simferopol players
FC Dynamo Moscow players
FC Lada-Tolyatti players
FC Energiya Volzhsky players
Expatriate footballers in Russia
Russian Premier League players
Ukrainian Premier League players
Kyrgyzstani people of Ukrainian descent
Ukrainian Premier League top scorers
Association football forwards